Chen Yan (born 1963) is a Chinese dramatist and novelist best known for his novel The Protagonist which won the 10th Mao Dun Literature Prize in 2019, one of the most prestigious literature prizes in China. He was a delegate to the 17th and 18th National Congress of the Chinese Communist Party.

Biography
Chen was born in Zhen'an County, Shaanxi, in 1963. At the age of 17, he published his first short story, Blasting, in Shaanxi Workers' Literature and Art. In 2004 he became president of Shaanxi Opera Research Institute.

Works

Novel
 
 
 English translation:

Drama
 Late-blooming Roses
 Big Tree Moves Westward
 Story of the West Capital

Essays

Awards
 2019 The Protagonist won the 10th Mao Dun Literature Prize

References

1963 births
Living people
Politicians from Shangluo
Writers from Shangluo
People's Republic of China novelists
Chinese dramatists and playwrights
20th-century Chinese novelists
21st-century Chinese novelists
20th-century Chinese male writers
Mao Dun Literature Prize laureates
Chinese male novelists
People's Republic of China politicians from Shaanxi
Dramatists of Chinese opera
Qinqiang